The IX Army Corps / IX AK was a corps level command of the Prussian and German Armies before and during World War I.

IX Corps was one of three formed in the aftermath of the Austro-Prussian War (the others being X Corps and XI Corps).  The Corps was formed in October 1866 with headquarters in Altona.  The catchment area included the newly annexed Province of Schleswig-Holstein, the Grand Duchies of Mecklenburg-Schwerin and Mecklenburg-Strelitz and the Hanseatic cities of Lübeck, Hamburg and Bremen.

During the Franco-Prussian War it was assigned to the 2nd Army.

The Corps was assigned to the III Army Inspectorate but joined the 1st Army at the start of the First World War.  It was still in existence at the end of the war.  The Corps was disbanded with the demobilisation of the German Army after World War I.

Franco-Prussian War 
During the Franco-Prussian War, the corps formed part of the 2nd Army.  The 17th Division was initially part of the reserve of the Prussian Army, so the 18th Division was joined by the Grand Ducal Hessian (25th) Division.  The Corps participated in the battles of Gravelotte, Orléans and Le Mans.

Flags of the Line Infantry regiments 
Due to the large number of Line Infantry regiments then in existence, on 18 December 1890, Kaiser Wilhelm II ordered that the flag colours were to be the same as that of the uniform epaulettes.  This was to ensure that each corps attained uniformity.  IX and X Corps wore white epaulettes.  Notwithstanding this, the flags of the Jäger Battalions would be green.

Peacetime organisation 
The 25 peacetime Corps of the German Army (Guards, I - XXI, I - III Bavarian) had a reasonably standardised organisation.  Each consisted of two divisions with usually two infantry brigades, one field artillery brigade and a cavalry brigade each.  Each brigade normally consisted of two regiments of the appropriate type, so each Corps normally commanded 8 infantry, 4 field artillery and 4 cavalry regiments.  There were exceptions to this rule:
V, VI, VII, IX and XIV Corps each had a 5th infantry brigade (so 10 infantry regiments)
II, XIII, XVIII and XXI Corps had a 9th infantry regiment
I, VI and XVI Corps had a 3rd cavalry brigade (so 6 cavalry regiments)
the Guards Corps had 11 infantry regiments (in 5 brigades) and 8 cavalry regiments (in 4 brigades).
Each Corps also directly controlled a number of other units.  This could include one or more
Foot Artillery Regiment
Jäger Battalion
Pioneer Battalion
Train Battalion

World War I

Organisation on mobilisation 
On mobilization on 2 August 1914 the Corps was restructured.  17th and 18th Cavalry Brigades were withdrawn to form part of the 4th Cavalry Division.  The 16th Dragoons, formerly of the X Corps, was raised to a strength of 6 squadrons before being split into two half-regiments of 3 squadrons each.  The half-regiments were assigned as divisional cavalry to 17th and 18th Divisions.  81st Infantry Brigade was transferred to 17th Reserve Division in IX Reserve Corps.  Divisions received engineer companies and other support units from the Corps headquarters.  In summary, IX Corps mobilised with 25 infantry battalions, 9 machine gun companies (54 machine guns), 6 cavalry squadrons, 24 field artillery batteries (144 guns), 4 heavy artillery batteries (16 guns), 3 pioneer companies and an aviation detachment.

Combat chronicle 
On mobilisation, IX Corps was assigned to the 1st Army on the right wing of the forces for the Schlieffen Plan offensive in August 1914 on the Western Front.  It participated in the Battle of Mons and the First Battle of the Marne which marked the end of the German advances in 1914.  Later it saw action in the Battle of Pozières and Battle of Amiens (1918).

It was still in existence at the end of the war.

Commanders 
The IX Corps had the following commanders during its existence:

See also 

Franco-Prussian War order of battle
German Army order of battle (1914)
List of Imperial German infantry regiments
List of Imperial German artillery regiments
List of Imperial German cavalry regiments
Order of battle at Mons
Order of battle of the First Battle of the Marne

References

Bibliography 
 
 
 
 
 

Corps of Germany in World War I
Military units and formations established in 1866
Military units and formations disestablished in 1919